The 2008 Belgian Figure Skating Championships took place between 23 and 24 November 2007 in Hasselt. Skaters competed in the discipline of ladies' singles.

Skaters from United Kingdom and Slovakia competed as guest skaters and their results were discounted from the final results.

Senior results

Men
No Belgian competitors

Ladies

External links
 results
 
 results

Belgian Figure Skating Championships
2007 in figure skating
Belgian Figure Skating Championships, 2008